The Apple Multiple Scan 14 Display is a 12.4″ viewable shadow mask CRT that was manufactured by Apple Inc. from August 7, 1995, until September 14, 1996.  This monitor has built-in speakers that can be connected with a cable that has a male miniature TRS connector on each end and there is also a headphone jack.  The video cable uses a standard Macintosh DA-15 video connector and the maximum resolution is 800×600.

References 
 EveryMac.com

Apple Inc. peripherals
Apple Inc. displays